Allobopyrus is a genus of Isopoda parasites, in the family Bopyridae, containing the following specie:

Allobopyrus rumphiusi Bourdon, 1983

References 

Isopod genera
Cymothoida